is a Japanese professional golfer.

Kawai has played on the Japan Golf Tour since 1997. He has one win on tour, the 2011 Japan PGA Championship Nissin Cupnoodle Cup.

Professional wins (1)

Japan Golf Tour wins (1)

References

External links

Japanese male golfers
Japan Golf Tour golfers
Sportspeople from Hiroshima Prefecture
1971 births
Living people